Hugo Armando González Muñoz (born 11 March 1963) is a Chilean former professional footballer who played as a centre-back.

González was born in Santiago de Chile and made his debut for the national senior squad on 25 June 1988, in a friendly against Peru.

Honours
Colo-Colo
 Chilean Primera División (2): 1986, 1989
 Copa Chile (4): 1985, 1988, 1989, 1994

Cobreloa
 Chilean Primera División (1): 1992

Chile
  (1):

References

External links
 
 Hugo González at MemoriaWanderers 
 Hugo González at PartidosdeLaRoja 

1963 births
Living people
Footballers from Santiago
Chilean footballers
Chilean expatriate footballers
Chile international footballers
Association football defenders
1989 Copa América players
Expatriate footballers in Mexico
Chilean expatriate sportspeople in Mexico
Santiago Wanderers footballers
Colo-Colo footballers
Cruz Azul footballers
Cobreloa footballers
Deportes Concepción (Chile) footballers
Deportes Magallanes footballers
Magallanes footballers
Chilean Primera División players
Liga MX players
Primera B de Chile players
Chilean football managers
Colo-Colo managers
Chilean Primera División managers